Valentina Herszage (born March 11, 1998, in Rio de Janeiro) is a Brazilian actress.

Career 
Valentina Herszage attended Cândido Mendes University and studied Theatre arts. As a child, in 2009, she starred in the children's short film Direita É a Mão que Você Escreve, directed by Paulo Santos, screened in 2010 at the Mostra de Cinema Infantil de Florianópolis.

In 2015, she participated in the film Kill Me Please as Bia and received the Redentor Award for Actress in the 2015 edition of the Rio Festival.

In 2016, she acted in the play Jovem Estudante Busca. She debuted on television in the 2017 telenovela Pega Pega as Bebeth Ribeiro.

Filmography

Cinema

Television

Awards and nominations

References 

1998 births
Living people
People from Rio de Janeiro (city)
Brazilian television actresses